Tomáš Protivný (born January 24, 1986) is a Czech former professional ice hockey defenceman.

Protivný played in the Czech Extraliga with HC Sparta Praha and HC Kometa Brno. He also played in the Polska Hokej Liga for JKH GKS Jastrzębie.

References

External links 

 

1986 births
Living people
HC Berounští Medvědi players
Czech ice hockey defencemen
BK Havlíčkův Brod players
SHK Hodonín players
JKH GKS Jastrzębie players
LHK Jestřábi Prostějov players
HC Kometa Brno players
BK Mladá Boleslav players
HC Olomouc players
Orli Znojmo players
People from Nymburk
HC Sparta Praha players
Stadion Hradec Králové players
Sportspeople from the Central Bohemian Region
Czech expatriate ice hockey people
Czech expatriate sportspeople in Poland
Expatriate ice hockey players in Poland